Belsele is a village and a  deelgemeente of the municipality of Sint-Niklaas, which is situated in the Belgian province of East Flanders.

History 
Belsele was first mentioned in 870. In 1217 Belsele became an autonomous parish. In that time Belsele and Sinaai were united in rule in a tribunal (under the Keure van Waas). In 1795, Belsele became canton Capitol of the Scheldt department, with Daknam, Eksaarde, Elversele, Kemzeke, Sinaai, Sint-Pauwels, Tielrode and Waasmunster as subordinate municipalities.
This statute was in force till the Belgian Revolution in 1830. Until the first half of the twentieth century, Belsele maintained its typical character of a farmers village in the Waas. Production was mainly focussed on flax and wheat till 1850. This was changed in the twentieth century, when the emphasis was put on food, construction and textile. Since the second world war, Belsele evolved to a green, residential area. Most of the people work in Sint-Niklaas and Antwerp (fewer).
The hamlet Puivelde forms a separate entity.

Gallery

References 

Sint-Niklaas
Populated places in East Flanders